CPD−57°2874 is a B[e] supergiant in the constellation Carina. It is a rare star as it is hot but has dust which shows forbidden lines and IR emissions. In 2007 the high spatial and spectral resolution of the star's circumstellar envelope was studied. This was the first time such a study was carried out on a class B[e] supergiant.

Disc
CPD−57°2874 is surrounded by a disc of expelled stellar material. The particular alignment, temperature, and density of the disc combine to produce the forbidden spectral lines. The detached ring leads to speculation that the inner regions are cleared by an unseen binary companion.

Variability
Photometry of CPD−57°2874 suggests that it is variable with an amplitude of perhaps 0.2 magnitude. It has not been formally classified as a variable star and the cause of the variations is unclear.

See also
3 Puppis
HD 37974
HD 268835

References

B-type supergiants
Carina (constellation)
PD-57 02874
B(e) stars
Suspected variables